(In all friendship) is a German television soap opera that began airing in 1998 every Tuesday. The series follows the staff of the fictional Sachsenklinik hospital in the city of Leipzig.

The series is produced by Degeto (a subsidiary of the German TV channel ARD) and by Saxonia Media Filmproduktion GmbH in the studios of Media City Leipzig.

The first broadcast was on 26 October 1998. Since then, approximately 600 episodes have aired.

Initially, the focus was on three main characters and their friendship Dr. Roland Heilmann, Dr. Achim Kreutzer, and Dr. Maia Dietz. Nowadays, there is a growing cast of 15–20 characters which the plot follows (of the original trio, only Dr. Roland Heilmann can still be seen in the program).

Many actors were already acting in the television and cinema in the German Democratic Republic. Other locally renowned directors from the former GDR that contribute to the program include Celino Bleiweiß, Klaus Gendries, and Peter Hill.

Even though the series is set in the city of Leipzig (Saxony), which is home to the Upper Saxon German dialect, it is rarely used in the series in order to make it easier for the rest of the German population to understand.

Current cast 
As of 2016, the cast consists of the following actors:
 Arzu Bazman as Arzu Ritter
 Rolf Becker as Otto Stein
 Bernhard Bettermann as Dr. Martin Stein
 Ursula Karusseit as Charlotte Gauss
 Thomas Koch as Dr. Philipp Brentano
 Karsten Kühn as Jakob Heilmann
 Andrea Kathrin Loewig as Dr. Kathrin Globisch
 Anja Nejarri as Dr. Lea Peters
 Anthony Petrifke as Jonas Heilmann
 Thomas Rühmann as Dr. Roland Heilmann
 Jascha Rust as Christopher "Kris" Haas
 Udo Schenk as Dr. Rolf Kaminski
 Johann Lukas Sickert as Bastian Marquardt
 Alexa Maria Surholt as Sarah Marquardt
 Michael Trischan as Hans-Peter Brenner
 Anita Vulesica as Ulrike Stolze
 Henriette Zimmeck as Marie Stein
 Ella Zirzow as Lisa Schroth

Spin-off: In aller Freundschaft – Die jungen Ärzte 

In July 2014, the MDR announced the production of a spin-off named  - (In All Friendship - The Young Doctors). The series focuses on Dr. Niklas Ahrend, who at the beginning of the series accepts a senior physician's office at the Johannes-Thal-Klinikum in Erfurt, leaving the Sachsenklinik and five assistants. The production of 42 episodes took place since autumn 2014, the weekly broadcast on Thursday evenings began on 22 January 2015 at Das Erste.

Spin-off: In aller Freundschaft – Die Krankenschwestern 
In November 2018, a new spin-off begins named In aller Freundschaft – Die Krankenschwestern. The characters are introduced in both older series. In In aller Freundschaft, nurse Arzu meets a former classmate from nursing school who asks her to comme to Halle and help her with the formation of the new nurses. In Die jungen Ärzte, two of the main characters, Luisa and Jasmine, who have applied to the nursing school, have a car accident in Erfurt (where the young doctors show happens) and meet Fliete Petersen, the cousin of Elias Bähr, who works at the Johannes-Thal-Klinikum as a assistants. Fliete realises that he wants to train as a nurse too and follows his two new friends in Halle.

References

External links

Official German website
In aller Freundschaft-Spoiler 

Mitteldeutscher Rundfunk
German medical television series
German television soap operas
1998 German television series debuts
2000s German television series
2010s German television series
German-language television shows
Das Erste original programming